Aitor Iñaki Etxaburu Castro (born 17 June 1966 in Eibar) is a Spanish handball player who competed in the 1992 Summer Olympics and in the 1996 Summer Olympics.

In 1992 he was a member of the Spanish handball team which finished fifth in the Olympic tournament. He played all six matches and scored six goals.

Four years later he won the bronze medal with the Spanish team. He played five matches and scored eight goals.

References
 
 
 Aitor Etxaburu at European Handball Federation

1966 births
Living people
Spanish male handball players
Olympic handball players of Spain
Handball players at the 1992 Summer Olympics
Handball players at the 1996 Summer Olympics
Olympic bronze medalists for Spain
Sportspeople from Eibar
Olympic medalists in handball
Medalists at the 1996 Summer Olympics
BM Granollers players
Handball players from the Basque Country (autonomous community)
20th-century Spanish people